Pyatnytsky is Ukrainian form of Russian surname Pyatnitsky. Notable people with the surname include:

 Valery Pyatnitsky

See also
 Pyatnitsky (disambiguation)